Carting is a dog sport or activity in which a dog (usually a large breed) pulls a dogcart filled with supplies, such as farm goods, camping equipment, groceries or firewood, but sometimes pulling people. Carting as a sport is also known as dryland mushing and is practiced all around the world, often to keep winter sled dogs in competition form during the off-season. (Note that the term "dogcart" is primarily used to mean a particular type of light horse-drawn vehicle.)

Sulky driving 

A variety of carting is sulky driving, where a dog or dogs pulls a two-wheeled cart (sulky) with a person riding in the sulky. This sport offers both exercise and discipline opportunities for energetic breeds. Many working breeds are happier when given a job or task, and carting/sulky driving can be a rewarding hobby for both dog and owner.

The sulky is designed to have little to no weight on the dog's back, given their sensitive spine. A widely used model is the dorsal hitch, which involves only one shaft from the sulky that has negative weight on the dog's harness. The dorsal hitch also allows easier going for the dog, with free range of movement as opposed to confining shafts on either side. This often simplifies initial training to the sulky, as the shafts do not interfere with the dog's movement.

Dogs from 15 kg body weight and upwards are able to pull an adult and a sulky comfortably. The general rule is that the total load (sulky and driver) should not exceed three times the weight of the dog doing the pulling. If, for example, the sulky and driver totaled 150 kg, then the weight of the dog pulling would need to be at least 50 kg. Smaller dogs may be used as long as the cart is of a type which can handle multiple dog draft, and the combined weight of the dogs pulling is at least one third of the load being pulled.

Dryland mushing 

Dryland mushing is distinguished from sulky driving in that the cart, or dryland rig, is attached to the dog in the same manner as a team to a sled. The cart has three or four wheels, with the driver either sitting or standing, depending on the cart construction. The International Federation of Sled Dog Sports sponsors one of the largest dryland mushing events in the world, the IFSS Dryland World Championship.

See also 

 Drafting dog

References

External links 
 
 UK Group Finder - find you local canicross, bikejor, scootering and dog-carting(rigging) club

Dog sports